The Lake Superior Scottish Regiment is a Primary Reserve infantry regiment of the Canadian Forces.  The regiment is located in Thunder Bay, Ontario, and is part of the 3rd Canadian Division's 38 Canadian Brigade Group. Also known as "The Lake Sups" (pronounced soups), the regiment was active during the First and Second World Wars. During the latter, the regiment, then known as The Lake Superior Regiment or LSR, mobilized a motorized infantry battalion for the 4th Canadian (Armoured) Division; The Lake Superior Regiment (Motor) or LSR(M).

The LSR(M) and 28th Armoured Regiment (The British Columbia Regiment) were the only Canadian land-based units to score a naval victory during the Second World War. On November 5, 1944, the units sank three small German ships and destroyed a fourth in the port of Zijpe. One legend suggests a mortar round fired by the infantry made its way down the funnel of one of the ships. The ship's bell from one of the sunken vessels was recovered, and is in the Officer's Mess of the British Columbia Regiment (Duke of Connaught's Own).

Since World War II, its soldiers have served throughout the world on numerous peacekeeping operations. Most recently, the LSSR has had several soldiers serve in Afghanistan. The regiment lost one soldier, Corporal Anthony "T-Bone" Boneca on July 9, 2006, fighting Taliban insurgents during Operation Zahar ("sword") in Zhari District, Kandahar Province.

Regimental information

Armoral description
A large maple leaf in center charged with a beaver, encircled by an annulus, inscribed THE LAKE SUPERIOR SCOTTISH REGIMENT and surmounted by the Crown; below a scroll inscribed INTER PERICULA INTREPIDI; on each side of the annulus with six maple leaves.

Motto 
Inter Pericula Intrepidi 
Fearless in the face of danger

Official abbreviation
Lake Sup Scot R

Tartan
MacGillivary

Lineage

The Lake Superior Scottish Regiment
Originated 3 July 1905 in Port Arthur, Ontario when a "regiment of infantry" was authorized to be formed
Designated 1 December 1905 as the 96th The Lake Superior Regiment
Redesignated 12 March 1920 as The Lake Superior Regiment
Redesignated 7 November 1940 as the 2nd (Reserve) Battalion, The Lake Superior Regiment
Redesignated 1 April 1946 as The Lake Superior Regiment (Motor)
Redesignated 29 June 1949 as The Lake Superior Scottish Regiment (Motor)
Redesignated 11 April 1958 as The Lake Superior Scottish Regiment

Lineage chart

Perpetuations

The Great War
52nd Battalion (New Ontario), CEF
141st (Rainy River District) Battalion (Border Bull Moose), CEF

Operational history

The Great War
Details of the 96th The Lake Superior Regiment were placed on active service on 6 August 1914 for local protective duty.

The 52nd Battalion (New Ontario), CEF, was authorized on 7 November 1914 and embarked for Britain on 23 November 1915. The battalion disembarked in France on 21 February 1916, where it fought as part of the 9th Infantry Brigade, 3rd Canadian Division in France and Flanders until the end of the war. The battalion disbanded on 30 August 1920.

The 141st (Rainy River District) Battalion (Border Bull Moose), CEF, was authorized on 22 December 1915 and embarked for Britain on 29 April 1917, where its personnel were absorbed by the 18th Reserve Battalion, CEF on 7 May 1917 to provide reinforcements for the Canadian Corps in the field. The battalion disbanded on 17 July 1917.

The Second World War
The regiment mobilized The Lake Superior Regiment, CASF, on 24 May 1940. It was redesignated as the 1st Battalion, The Lake Superior Regiment, CASF, on 7 November 1940 and as the 1st Battalion, The Lake Superior Regiment (Motor), CASF, on 26 January 1942. It embarked for Britain on 22 August 1942. On 26 and 27 July 1944, it landed in France as part of the 4th Canadian Armoured Brigade, 4th Canadian (Armoured) Division, and it continued to fight in northwest Europe until the end of the war. The overseas battalion disbanded on 15 February 1946.

War In Afghanistan
The regiment contributed an aggregate of more than 20% of its authorized strength to the various Task Forces which served in Afghanistan between 2002 and 2014.

Alliances 

 – The Royal Anglian Regiment
 – 5th/6th Battalion, The Royal Victoria Regiment

Battle Honours
In the list below, battle honours in capitals were awarded for participation in large operations and campaigns, while those in lowercase indicate honours granted for more specific battles. Those battle honours followed by a "+" are emblazoned on the regimental colour.

The Great War
+

+
+
Flers-Courcelette
Ancre Heights

Vimy, 1917+
+
Passchendaele+
+
Scarpe, 1918
Drocourt-Quéant
+
Canal du Nord
Cambrai, 1918+
+

The Second World War
+
Falaise Road+
The Laison
Chambois
+
The Lower Maas+
+
The Hochwald+
Veen
Twente Canal+
Friesoythe+
Küsten Canal+
Bad Zwischenahn
 +

War in Afghanistan

Notable soldiers 

 Major Christopher O'Kelly, 
 Colonel Robert Angus Keane, 
 Sergeant Charles Henry Byce, 
 Lieutenant-General Omer Lavoie,

See also 

 Canadian-Scottish regiment
 List of armouries in Canada
 Military history of Canada
 History of the Canadian Army
 Canadian Forces
 Razing of Friesoythe

Notes

References

General references
 Barnes, RM, The Uniforms and History of the Scottish Regiments, London, Sphere Books Limited, 1972.

Further reading
Stanley, George F.G., In the Face of Danger: The History of the Lake Superior Regiment (1960)
Beaulieu, Michel S., David K. Ratz, Thorold J. Tronrud, and Jenna L. Kirker. Thunder Bay and the First World War, 1914-1919. Thunder Bay: Thunder Bay Historical Museum Society, 2018.
Fedak, Michael. Letters to Leah: The Experiences of a Member of the Lake Superior Regiment (motor) During the Second World War from August 1944 to May 1945, introduced by David K. Ratz. Thunder Bay: Lake Superior Scottish Regiment, 2012.
Private W.C. Millar, From Thunder Bay Through Ypres with the Fighting 52nd, edited by Thorold J. Tronrud and annotated by David Ratz. Thunder Bay: Thunder Bay Historical Museum Society, 2010. 
Ratz, David Karl. "Aid to the Civil Power: The 96th 'Lake Superior Regiment' 1909 and 1912."  Thunder Bay Historical Museum Society Papers & Records (1991): 51–64.
Ratz, David. "Strike Duty," the Canadian Military and Labour at the Lakehead before the First World War." In Essays in Northwestern Ontario Working Class History, edited by Michel S. Beaulieu, 29-49. Thunder Bay: Lakehead University Centre for Northern Studies, 2008.
Ratz, David K. "Pete Musselman, Teacher and Soldier." Thunder Bay Historical Museum Society Papers & Records (2003): 21–50.
Ratz, David. "The Controversy Over Unit Designation and Perpetuation: The History of the Lake Superior Scottish Regiment." Journal of the Military History Society of Manitoba (1999): 50–56.

External links 

 Bravery in the Face of Danger - The Lake Superior Regiment Motor

Order of precedence

Armoury

Lake Superior Scottish Regiment
Infantry regiments of Canada
Highland & Scottish regiments of Canada
Organizations based in Thunder Bay
Military units and formations of Ontario
Military units and formations established in 1905
Infantry regiments of Canada in World War II
History of Thunder Bay